Drastique (formerly known as Drastic) is an avant-garde gothic metal band from Italy with progressive metal and symphonic black metal influences.

Biography 
Drastique was founded as a one-man band in 1995 by Chris Buchman with the name Drastic. The only demo of the band, Creator of Feelings, was released in September 1995 in 200 copies with a black and white cover and then reissued in 1996 by Beyond Productions with a color cover. The demo featured Chiara Donaggio on female vocals and was produced by Marco Biolcati, vocalist and guitar player of the bands Wrest and Blackburn. Creator of Feelings was selected as "best demo" by Metal hammer magazine, Metal Shock magazine and Flash magazine. In 1998 Drastic released on Beyond Productions its debut album titled Thieves of Kisses, featuring Alessia De Boni / Pamsy and Chiara Donaggio on female vocals. The album was recorded at Nadir Studios in Genoa, Italy and was produced by Tommy Talamanca, guitar and keyboard player of the band Sadist. Thieves of Kisses was selected by a journalist of the popular music magazine Metal hammer as "Best Italian Album of the Year" and can be considered one of the first Italian avant-garde metal releases. In 2000 Drastic rearranged and performed the song "Black Mass" by Death SS: the song was featured on the tribute album Beyond the realms of Death SS, published by Black Widow Records. In 2003 Drastic changed the name into Drastique and released (once again on Beyond Productions, the label of such bands as Sadist and Theatres Des Vampires) the album Pleasureligion featuring the female vocalist Fay and the male vocalist Mahavira (formerly of Ensoph), even if some male parts were performed by Chris Buchman, who has written and performed the instrumental parts and is the author of the lyrics, written in English, Polish, Latin and Italian, with numerous poetic and philosophical quotations. The album was released in a limited digipak version and in a jewel case version. The CD is distributed by Masterpiece Distribution in Italy and by Adipocere, Relapse and Century Media worldwide. In 2004, the album has been licensed to CD Maximum for Russia and Eastern Europe.

Discography

Studio albums 
Thieves of Kisses (1998)
Pleasureligion (2003)
Let Your Life Pass You By(2012)

Demo 
Creator of Feelings (1995)

Compilations 
Screams from Italy Vol. II (1996)
Black Tears of Death Vol. I (1996)
Florilegium Insanie (1999)
Beyond the Realms of Death SS (2000)
Metallian Sampler n.29 (2003)
Loud Souds n.11 – Rock Hard Magazine (2003)

Members

Current line up 
 Chris Buchman – vocals, guitar, bass guitar, keyboard, drums (1995–present)
 Fay – female vocals (2002–present)
 Mahavira – male vocals (2002–present)

Former members 
 Chiara Donaggio – female vocals (1995–2001)
 Alessia De Boni – female vocals (1997–2001)

References

External links 
 Official website
 Drastique at Myspace
 Drastique at Encyclopaedia Metallum
 Drastique at Metal Weave
 Drastique at Beyond Productions (label)
 Drastique at Discogs
 Drastique at MusicBrainz

Italian gothic metal musical groups
Symphonic black metal musical groups
Avant-garde metal musical groups
Musical groups established in 1995
Italian progressive metal musical groups